India–Spain relations (Hindi: भारत–स्पेन संबंध; Spanish: Relaciones entre India e España) refers to interstate relations between India and Spain.

History

Relations between India and Spain are warm since the establishment of democracy in Spain in 1978. Diplomatic relations between India and Spain were established in 1956 with the opening of the Spanish Embassy in New Delhi. Maharaja Sawai Man Singh II, the Maharaja of Jaipur, was appointed in 1965 as the first Ambassador of India to Spain.

Bilateral relations

Official visits by Prime Ministers 
In 1992 Prime Minister P. V. Narasimha Rao and in 2017 Prime Minister Narendra Modi Visited Spain.

Trade 
Relations between India and Spain have been cordial since the establishment of diplomatic relations in 1956. A Mission headed by a Cd'A opened in Madrid in 1958. The first resident Ambassador of India was appointed in 1965.

Spain is India's 7th largest trade partner in the European Union. Bilateral trade in 2017-18 stood at US$5.66 billion (Dept. of Commerce), posting a growth of 4.91% over similar period a year ago. India's exports grew 16.65% and stood at US$3.99 billion while imports shrank by 15.51% and stood at US$1.66 billion. India's top exports to Spain are textiles, organic chemicals, iron & steel, seafood, automobiles and leather. India's major imports are mechanical appliances, electrical machinery, chemicals, plastic and mineral fuels.

Spain is the 15th largest investor in India with cumulative FDI stock of US$2.76 billion (April 2000 – June 2018). There are nearly 200 Spanish companies in India mainly in the sectors of metallurgical industries, renewable energy, automotive, ceramics and infrastructure mainly in highways, transmission lines, tunnels and metro stations. Maharashtra, Tamil Nadu, Gujarat, Andhra Pradesh and Karnataka are the major destinations for Spanish investments in India. Indian investment in Spain stood at around US$900 million. There are nearly 40 Indian companies in Spain mainly in software & IT services, pharmaceuticals, chemicals and logistics. India is among the top 30 investors in Spain globally and among the top 5 from Asia.

Commerce Secretary led the Indian delegation to the 11th round of India Spain JCEC held in Madrid in January 2018. Under the framework of the JCEC, the India Spain CEOs Forum was constituted in February 2015. The first formal meeting of the CEOs Forum was held in Madrid in May 2017. Global Innovation & Technology Alliance (GITA) along with the Spanish Centre for Development of Industrial Technology (CDTI) instituted the India-Spain Programme of Cooperation on Industrial Research and Development, a bilateral framework for providing financial support to collaborative R&D ventures between Indian and Spanish industry and academia. 

India and Spain have an ongoing Joint Programme of Cooperation in S&T, signed in 2009. A Science, Technology and Innovation Steering Committee Meeting was held in September 2017 in Madrid, as highlighted in the Joint Statement during the PM's visit to Spain. There are ongoing innovation driven joint R&D projects in sectors such as biosensors, bio pesticides, bio-economy, waste-to-energy, e-health and flexible electronics. During the PM visit, a MoU on cooperation in Organ transplants was also signed. 

India Spain bilateral cooperation in sports has been strengthened by interaction between the sports industries in both countries and participation of leading players and teams in events in India and vice versa especially in football, badminton, hockey, and kabaddi. There is potential for having a separate MOU for cooperation in the field of sports. Recognizing the immense potential for strengthening cooperation in the field of tourism, it was agreed to set up an Expert Panel on Tourism during PM's visit. The first India-Spain Expert Panel on Tourism was held in Madrid on May 21, 2018, led by Shri Suman Billa (JS, M/Tourism) on the Indian side and Mr. Manuel Butler (DG, Turespaña) on the Spanish side.  

India regularly participates in major international trade fairs and conferences in Spain viz. FITUR (Tourism), Mobile World Congress (Telecom), CPhI Worldwide (Pharmaceuticals) and Smart City Expo World Congress (Smart Cities). As agreed in the Joint Statement issued during PM's visit, the II Spain India Forum was jointly organized by CII and Spain India Council Foundation in Madrid in November 2017, in which over 200 companies participated. During 2017, the Embassy, in collaboration with its local chambers of Commerce and Industry associations, organized around 40 commercial events for trade and investment promotion and to present government's flagship initiatives. These events were focused on key sectors like infrastructure, renewals energy, food processing, automotives, defence, IT, smart cities, tourism, agri-food sector, innovation and gastronomy

Controversies

On October 17, 2022, the Spanish Embassy in New Delhi arbitrarily denied visas to 21 female and male Indian Wrestlers, preventing them from participating in the U-23 World Championships scheduled in Pontevedra, Spain from October 17 - 23, 2022. Denials included the U-20 Gold Medalist Antim Panghal.

References

 
Spain
Bilateral relations of Spain